Mark Anthony James Vaile  (born 18 April 1956) is a former deputy prime minister of Australia and former leader of the National Party of Australia. Vaile is currently a non-executive director of a number of public listed corporations.

Early life
Vaile was born in Sydney and worked as a farm machinery retailer and stock and station and real-estate agent before entering politics. He was a member of the Greater Taree City Council 1985–93, including three years as deputy mayor.

Parliamentary career
Vaile was a member of the Australian House of Representatives between March 1993 and July 2008, representing the Division of Lyne in New South Wales. In his first bid for the seat, in the 1993 election, Vaile led over the Liberals by only 233 votes on the third count, despite the seat's long history as a National stronghold. Labor had taken a large first-count lead which it held for most of the night, but Vaile won after Liberal preferences flowed overwhelmingly to him. However, had 120 votes gone the other way, the Liberals would have taken the seat. Vaile was able to revert the seat to its traditional status as a safe National seat in 1996, and he would go on to hold the seat without serious difficulty from then onward.

He was Assistant National Party Whip 1994–96 and National Party Whip 1996–97. In 1997 he was appointed Minister for Transport and Regional Development, and in 1998 he became Minister for Agriculture, Fisheries and Forestry. In July 1999, following the resignation of Tim Fischer and the election of John Anderson as National Party leader, he was elected the party's Deputy Leader and became Minister for Trade. When John Anderson resigned in 2005, Vaile was elected Leader unopposed. On 6 July 2005 he was sworn in as Deputy Prime Minister.

As Trade Minister, Vaile was involved in the negotiation of the US–Australia Free Trade Agreement, which was opposed by some traditional National Party constituencies such as the sugar industry.

There was much controversy over the intellectual property chapter of the US–Australia Free Trade Agreement. The chapter contains elements modelled on the Sonny Bono Copyright Term  extension Act 1998 (US) and the Digital Millennium Copyright Act 1998 (US) In December 2003, Trade Minister Mark Vaile pledged to defend the copyright term in Australia: "It is a very important issue, particularly in terms of cost to libraries, educational institutions and the like here in Australia." Two months later, Australia agreed to a copyright term extension, as part of the deal with the United States. There was also much criticism of the adoption of a US-style technological protection measures – particularly as the High Court of Australia was considering the matter of Stevens v Sony. There was also controversy over the evergreening of pharmaceutical drug patents and access to essential medicines under the US–Australia Free Trade Agreement.

During 2005 he also conducted negotiations for the proposed Australia–China Free Trade Agreement. In late 2005 he had an operation to remove a malignant melanoma from his back.

Since Vaile took on the leadership of the Nationals in 2005, there were increasing suggestions for Vaile to take on a domestic portfolio as the trade portfolio requires frequent overseas travel. Throughout 2006, Vaile's position in the trade portfolio came under increasing scrutiny due to his handling of the AWB kickbacks scandal and Australia's worsening trade performance. He also faced the difficult task of placating his back bench, with Queensland Senator Barnaby Joyce having crossed the floor on more than one occasion. On 24 September 2006 he switched portfolios with deputy Nationals leader Warren Truss and became Minister for Transport and Regional Services. His new position had a greater focus on regional Australia, the Nationals party's main constituency.

Following the coalition's defeat at the 2007 federal election, Vaile resigned his position as Nationals leader and moved to the backbench. His resignation surprised his colleagues as he had been expected to be re-elected unopposed following the election. On 19 July 2008 Vaile announced his forthcoming resignation from Parliament; he submitted it on 30 July. The ensuing by-election was won by independent Rob Oakeshott, the former state member for Port Macquarie and a former Vaile staffer.

Post-parliament career
In September 2008, Vaile was appointed to the board of Virgin Australia Holdings. He was replaced by Angus Houston in December 2018.

Vaile is also the independent chairman and a non-executive director of Whitehaven Coal, non-executive director of Palisade Investment Partners, a specialist independent infrastructure manager; a non-executive director of Hostplus, a non-executive director of Servcorp; a director of the Singapore-listed Stamford Land Corporation; and Chairman of 123 Childcare, an education provider in the People's Republic of China.

In June 2021 it was announced that Vaile would succeed Paul Jeans as Chancellor of the University of Newcastle. However following a backlash over his links to the coal industry, Vaile did not take up the post.

Honours
On 1 January 2001, Vaile was awarded the Centenary Medal for "service as Minister for Trade". In 2012 he was appointed an Officer of the Order of Australia for distinguished service to the Parliament of Australia, through support for rural and regional communities, to the pursuit of global trade and investment opportunities, and to the citizens of the Taree region.

Personal
A Roman Catholic, Vaile is married with three children. He lives on a  rural property outside Taree, New South Wales.

References

External links
 Mark Vaile's Maiden Speech in the House of Representatives
 

1956 births
20th-century Australian politicians
21st-century Australian politicians
Australian monarchists
Australian Roman Catholics
Deputy Prime Ministers of Australia
Government ministers of Australia
Leaders of the National Party of Australia
Living people
Members of the Australian House of Representatives
Members of the Australian House of Representatives for Lyne
Members of the Cabinet of Australia
National Party of Australia members of the Parliament of Australia
Officers of the Order of Australia
Politicians from Sydney
Recipients of the Centenary Medal